Antithesis, in rhetoric, is a counter-proposition that denotes a direct contrast to the original proposition.

Antithesis may also refer to:

 Antithesis (Netherlands), a political conflict in Dutch history
 Antithesis (Origin album)
 Antithesis (Gypsy album)